Johnswell is a village in County Kilkenny, Ireland. 

On the village green is a powerful spring and well dedicated to John the Baptist which was traditionally the venue for a local "pattern" (religious fair) of note, while the moat north of the village was the site of St John's Eve bonfires.

Maureen Hegarty (1 September 1921 – 14 January 2016), who was a local historian and president of the Kilkenny Archaeological Society, grew up there.

See also
 List of towns and villages in Ireland

References

Towns and villages in County Kilkenny